Michael Joseph McGivney (August 12, 1852August 14, 1890) was an Irish-American Catholic priest based in New Haven, Connecticut. He founded the Knights of Columbus at a local parish to serve as a mutual aid and fraternal insurance organization, particularly for immigrants and their families. It developed through the 20th century as the world's largest Catholic fraternal organization.

The cause for his canonization started in the Archdiocese of Hartford in 1996; in March 2008, Pope Benedict XVI declared McGivney "Venerable" in recognition of his "heroic virtue". On May 27, 2020, Pope Francis announced that McGivney had been approved for beatification, which officially happened on October 31, 2020. The pope's action means that McGivney can be declared "Blessed", the step just prior to sainthood. An additional miracle attributed to McGivney's intercession will be required for his canonization as a saint.

Early life
He was born to Irish immigrant parents, Patrick and Mary (Lynch) McGivney. He was the eldest of 13 children, six of whom died in infancy or childhood. His father worked as a molder in a Waterbury, Connecticut, brass mill. Michael attended the local Waterbury district school but left at 13 to work in one of the brass mills' spoon-making departments.

Studies
In 1868, at the age of 16, he entered the Séminaire de Saint-Hyacinthe in Saint-Hyacinthe, Quebec, Canada. He continued his studies at Our Lady of Angels Seminary, near Niagara Falls, New York, (1871–1872) and at the Jesuits' St. Mary's College, in Montreal, Quebec. While in seminary, he and other seminarians formed a baseball team and McGivney was a "naturally talented ballplayer." He had to leave the seminary, returning home to help finish raising his siblings after his father's death in June 1873. McGivney later resumed his studies at St. Mary's Seminary, in Baltimore, Maryland; he was ordained a priest on December 22, 1877, by Archbishop James Gibbons at the Baltimore Cathedral of the Assumption.

Founding of the Knights of Columbus
From his own experience, McGivney recognized the devastating effect on immigrant families of the father and wage earner's untimely death. Many Catholics were still struggling to assimilate into the American economy. On March 29, 1882, while an assistant pastor at Saint Mary's Church in New Haven, Connecticut, McGivney founded the Knights of Columbus, with a small group of parishioners, as a mutual aid society, to provide financial assistance, in the event of the men's deaths, to their widows and orphans. The organization developed as a fraternal society. McGivney was also known for his tireless work among his parishioners.

McGivney spent seven years at St. Mary's, then became pastor of St. Thomas Church in Thomaston in 1884. He died from pneumonia at the age of 38 in Thomaston on the eve of the Assumption in 1890.  
 
The Knights of Columbus was among the first groups to recruit blood donors, with formal efforts dating to 1937 during the Great Depression. As of 2013, the order has more than 1.8 million member families and 15,000 councils. During the 2012 fraternal year, the order donated $167 million and 70 million man-hours to charity.

By 2020, the order reached the 2 million member mark. During the 2019 fraternal year, the order donated $187 million and 77 million man-hours to charity.

Cause of beatification and canonization

In 1996, the Roman Catholic Archdiocese of Hartford opened the cause for canonization, an investigation into McGivney's life with a view towards formal recognition by the Catholic Church of his sainthood. Gabriel O'Donnell is the postulator of McGivney's cause. He is also the director of the Fr. McGivney Guild, which now has 150,000 members supporting his cause.

The diocesan investigation was closed in 2000, and the case was passed to the Congregation for the Causes of Saints in Vatican City. On March 15, 2008, Pope Benedict XVI approved a decree recognizing McGivney's heroic virtue, thus declaring him as "Venerable."

, a miracle attributed to McGivney's intercession was under investigation at the Vatican. On May 27, 2020, the miracle attributed to the intercession of McGivney was approved by Congregation for the Causes of Saints and authorized by Pope Francis. The Miracle involved the healing of Michael "Mikey" Schachle in his mother's womb after being given a zero percent chance of survival by doctors at Vanderbilt Medical Center in 2015.

On October 31, 2020, the beatification Mass of Michael McGivney was celebrated at the Cathedral of Saint Joseph in Hartford, Connecticut with Cardinal Joseph W. Tobin  presiding on the Pope's behalf.

Legacy
 1989, the York Catholic District School Board in Ontario, Canada, founded a school named Father Michael McGivney Catholic Academy in his honor. It is located in Markham and currently has 1,400 students.
 Douglas Brinkley and Julie M. Fenster's biography of Fr. McGivney, Parish Priest: Father Michael McGivney and American Catholicism, was published by William Morrow and Company in 2006. 
 The Catholic University of America renamed a prominent building on their campus as McGivney Hall.

 A stained-glass window depicting McGivney was dedicated September 12, 2009, at St. John Fisher Seminary in Stamford, Connecticut, by Bishop William E. Lori, of Bridgeport. The window was created by Rohl's Stained and Leaded Glass Studio of New Rochelle, New York. 
 Father McGivney Catholic High School in Glen Carbon, Illinois

See also 

 List of beatified people
 Roman Catholicism in the United States#American Catholic Servants of God, Venerables, Beatified, and Saints

References

Further reading

External links

The McGivney Guild
Third Class Relic of Father Michael J. McGivney
History of San Salvador Council One – New Haven, CT
Knights of Columbus Museum-New Haven, CT
Michael McGivney closer to sainthood
press.vatican.va

19th-century American Roman Catholic priests
Venerated Catholics by Pope Benedict XVI
People from Waterbury, Connecticut
American people of Irish descent
1852 births
1890 deaths
19th-century deaths from tuberculosis
Tuberculosis deaths in Connecticut
19th-century venerated Christians
Niagara University alumni
St. Mary's Seminary and University alumni
Catholics from Connecticut
American beatified people
Beatifications by Pope Francis